Monte d'Oro  is a mountain in the department of Haute-Corse on the island of Corsica, France, one of the highest on the island.
It is in the south of the Monte Rotondo massif, but is sometimes considered the summit of its own massif, the Monte d'Oro massif.

Location

Monte d'Oro is in the commune of Vivario in the west of Haute-Corse near the boundary with Corse-du-Sud.
Lac d'Oro lies to the northwest.
The Foret de Vizzavona is to the east and south of the mountain, and the village and railway station of Vizzavona Gare is to the southeast.

Physical

From its peak, the view extends far over Corsica, blocked only by distant mountains such as Monte Rotondo to the north and Monte Renoso to the south.

The hike to the peak from the Col de Vazzavona is fairly challenging, including long and steep routes with an exposed ridge traverse, a hanging scree field and a climb through exposed ledges and chimneys.
The weather can also be treacherous, with strong winds, heavy clouds and storms.

Gallery

Notes

Sources

Mountains of Haute-Corse